Noreña is a municipality in the Autonomous Community of the Principality of Asturias, Spain. It is surrounded by the municipality of Siero. It is the smallest municipality in Asturias and the second smallest in Spain, and one of the ones with the highest per capita income and population density in the Principality.
Noreña is also the name of a parish in the municipality, and the municipal capital.

Parishes
 Celles (San Juan de Celles)
 Noreña (Santa María de Noreña)
 Santa Marina

Notable people 
 Alberto Colunga Cueto, Dominican priest and Bible translator, was born in Noreña.
 Enrique Rodríguez Bustelo, architect

Gallery

References

External links
Ayuntamiento de Noreña
Federación Asturiana de Concejos 
Página del caminoreal 
Noreña entrañable.

Municipalities in Asturias